Red Velvet Car is the fourteenth studio album by American rock band Heart, released on August 31, 2010, by Legacy Recordings. The album debuted at number 10 on the US Billboard 200 with 27,000 copies sold in its first week, making it Heart's first top-10 album since Brigade (1990). It spawned the singles "Hey You" (number 26 on the Adult Contemporary chart) and "WTF" (number 19 on the Hot Singles Sales chart).

The album was released with differing track lists according to format in different territories: the standard US CD release features 10 tracks, the European CD and US download version contain 12 tracks, while the Japanese CD and some exclusive download versions contain 13 tracks. Though the 13th track is "Listening" on the Japanese CD, some exclusive download versions replace this with a live 2010 version of "Crazy on You".

Track listing

Personnel
Credits adapted from the liner notes of Red Velvet Car.

Heart
 Ann Wilson – vocals, flute
 Nancy Wilson – vocals, guitars, mandolin, autoharp, Dobro
 Ben Smith – drums, percussion
 Ric Markmann – bass guitar
 Ben Mink – guitars, gypsy fiddle, viola, lap steel, programming, vocals, string arrangements

Additional musicians
 Craig Bartock – Dobro on "Safronia's Mark"
 Geddy Lee – whistle on "Death Valley"

Technical
 Ben Mink – production
 David Leonard – recording, mixing
 Patrick MacDougall – second engineer
 Andrew Bodkin, Melanie Mullens, Matthew MacDougall, Masa Fukudome, David Eaman – engineering assistance
 Craig Waddell – mastering at Gotham City Studios (Vancouver)

Artwork
 Jesse Higman – cover image
 Amber McDonald – package design, photos
 Randee St. Nicholas – photos

Charts

Notes

References

2010 albums
Heart (band) albums
Legacy Recordings albums